Xuelin Wa Ethnic Township is an ethnic township in Lancang Lahu Autonomous County, Yunnan, China.

Administrative division
As of 2016, the township is divided into seven villages: 
Xuelin
Mangdeng
Xiaomangling
Nanpan
Zuodu
Damangling
Yongguang

Geography
The Xuelin Wa Ethnic Township is a border township lies at the northwestern Lancang Lahu Autonomous County. The township shares a border with Mongmao Township of Myanmar to the west, Mujia Township to the east, Cangyuan Va Autonomous County to the north, and Ximeng Va Autonomous County to the south.

The Gelang River and Gelang Longdai River flow through the township.

Economy
The region's economy is based on agriculture. The main crops of the region are grain, followed by corn and buckwheat.

Demographics

As of 2017, the National Bureau of Statistics of China estimates the township's population now to be 12,738.

Transportation
The National Highway G214 passes across the township north to south.

References

Bibliography

Townships of Pu'er City
Divisions of Lancang Lahu Autonomous County